The 1925–26 Austrian First League season was the fifteenth season of the top-tier football in Austria. It was contested by 13 teams which played 144 matches. SV Amateure won their second title as they finished four points ahead of second place First Vienna FC. ASV Hertha finished last and were relegated to the Second League.

League standings

Results

References
Austria - List of final tables (RSSSF)

Austrian Football Bundesliga seasons
Austria
1925–26 in Austrian football